Newton or (The Newton) is a small village in the county of West Lothian, Scotland.

All road traffic travelling west from the Forth Road Bridge currently has to pass through the village in order to gain access to the M9 Motorway although this was set to change under proposals to upgrade M9 Junction 1a as part of the Forth Replacement Crossing scheme by 2013.

The village's location serves it well as a commuter village for those who travel daily to Edinburgh and Fife. It currently hosts a petrol service station, a small shop and a pub.

Notable residents

Rev John Main DD FRSE (1728-1795) joint founder of the Royal Society of Edinburgh was minister of Newton

External links

Gazetteer for Scotland
Forth Replacement Crossing J1a upgrade proposals

Villages in West Lothian